Sewrin, real name Charles-Augustin Bassompierre, (9 October 1771 – 22 April 1853) was a French playwright and goguettier. In addition to his writing of comedies, opéras-comiques, vaudevilles and songs, he also was a librettist for François Adrien Boieldieu, Ferdinand Hérold and Luigi Cherubini

Biography 
Charles-Augustin Bassompierre was born 9 October 1771 in Metz, a French fortress in the Three Bishoprics. Soon after the Révolution, the young Charles-Augustin moved to Paris. In 1802, he is one of the eleven singers individually named, with three musicians, as members of the goguette Les Déjeuners des garçons de bonne humeur. A prolific author, from 1793 to 1825 he wrote libretto for operas comiques, vaudevilles, comedies and impromptus, alone or in collaboration with René de Chazet and Dumersan, as well as poems and novels. Appointed archivist secretary at Les Invalides under the Bourbon Restauration regime, he lost his position in 1830 with the fall of Charles X.

Charles-Augustin Bassompierre died in Paris 22 April 1853  and was buried in the Montparnasse cemetery.

A knight in the ordre de la Légion d'honneur, he was married to Louise-Julie des Acres de l'Aigle (1787–1845).

Works

Operas 
L'École de village, opéra-comique in 1 act, music by Jean-Pierre Solié, created at the Opéra-Comique (salle Favart) 10 May 1793
La Moisson, opéra-comique in 2 acts, music by Jean-Pierre Solié, created at the Opéra-Comique (salle Favart) 5 September 1793
Le Plaisir et la Gloire, opéra-comique in 1 act, music by Jean-Pierre Solié, created at the Opéra-Comique (salle Favart) 30 nivôse an II (19 January 1794)
La Chasse aux loups, opéra-comique in 1 act, created at the Théâtre de la Cité-Variétés 6 floréal an V (25 April 1797)
 Le Maçon, opéra-comique in 1 act, music by Louis-Sébastien Lebrun, created at the Théâtre Feydeau 14 frimaire an VIII (5 December 1799)
 Le Locataire, opera en 1 act, music by Pierre Gaveaux, created at the Opéra-Comique (salle Favart) 6 July 1800
François Ier ou la Fête mystérieuse, comédie lyrique in 3 acts, cowritten with René de Chazet, music by Rodolphe Kreutzer, created at the Opéra-Comique (Théâtre Feydeau) 14 March 1807
L'Opéra au village, opéra-comique in 1 act, music by Jean-Pierre Solié, created at the Opéra-Comique (Théâtre Feydeau) 30 July 1807
Jadis et aujourd'hui, opéra-comique in 1 act, music by Rodolphe Kreutzer, created at the Opéra-Comique (Théâtre Feydeau) 3 October 1808
Le Crescendo, opéra-comique in 1 act, music by Luigi Cherubini, created at the Opéra-Comique (Théâtre Feydeau) 1 September 1810
Le Forgeron de Bassora, opéra-comique in 2 acts, music by Frédéric Kreubé, created at the Opéra-Comique (Théâtre Feydeau) 14 October 1813
L'Héritier de Paimpol, opéra-comique in 3 acts, music by Nicolas-Charles Bochsa, created at the Opéra-Comique (Théâtre Feydeau) 29 December 1813
La Fête du village voisin, opéra-comique in 3 acts, music by François-Adrien Boieldieu, created at the Opéra-Comique (Théâtre Feydeau) 5 March 1816
Valentin, opéra-comique in 2 acts, music by Henri Montan Berton, created at the Opéra-Comique (Théâtre Feydeau) 10 December 1819
Le Roi René ou la Provence au quinzième siècle, opéra-comique in 2 acts cowritten with Gabriel-Alexandre Belle, music by Ferdinand Hérold, created at the Opéra-Comique (salle Favart) 24 August 1824

Theatre 

Julia ou les Souterrains du château de Mazzini, melodrama in 3 acts and in prose, created at the Théâtre des Jeunes-Artistes in frimaire an VII (December 1798)
Les Mariniers de Saint-Cloud, impromptu, created at the Opéra-Comique (salle Favart), 22 brumaire an VIII (13 November 1799)
La Leçon conjugale, comedy in 3 acts cowritten with René de Chazet, created 5 November 1804
La Laitière de Bercy, vaudeville in 2 acts cowritten with René de Chazet, created at the Théâtre du Vaudeville 23 February 1805
Lundi, mardi et mercredi, vaudeville in 3 acts cowritten with René de Chazet, created at the théâtre des Variétés 16 June 1806
Les Petites Marionnettes ou la Loterie, vaudeville in 1 act cowritten with René de Chazet, created at the Théâtre du Palais-Royal 27 September 1806
La Famille des innocents ou Comme l'amour vient, one-act comedy mingled with vaudevilles cowritten with René de Chazet, created at the Théâtre du Palais-Royal 26 January 1807
La Famille des lurons, vaudeville in 1 act cowritten with René de Chazet, created at the Théâtre du Vaudeville 13 July 1807
Pauvre Jacques, comedy in 3 acts and in prose mingled with vaudevilles cowritten with René de Chazet, created at the Théâtre du Vaudeville 31 October 1807
Romainville ou la Promenade du dimanche, vaudeville in 1 act cowritten with René de Chazet, created at the Théâtre des Variétés 30 November 1807
Anna ou les Deux Chaumières, comedy in 1 act and in prose mingled with songs, created at the Opéra-Comique (Théâtre Feydeau) 20 February 1808
Ordre et Désordre, three-act comedy cowritten with René de Chazet, created 26 March 1808
Les Acteurs à l'épreuve, vaudeville épisodique in 1 act cowritten with René de Chazet, created at the Théâtre des Variétés 7 June 1808
Lagrange-Chancel, one-act vaudeville cowritten with René de Chazet, created at the Théâtre des Variétés 22 November 1808
Coco Pépin, vaudeville in 1 act cowritten with René de Chazet, created at the Théâtre des Variétés 29 December 1809
Une soirée de carnaval, vaudeville in 1 act, created at the Théâtre des Variétés 12 February 1810 for the Carnaval de Paris
Le Petit Pêcheur, vaudeville in 1 act cowritten with Dumersan, created at the Théâtre des Variétés 8 August 1810
Grivois la malice, vaudeville in 1 act created at the Théâtre des Variétés 14 August 1810
La Fiancée du pays de Caux ou les Normands vengés, comedy in 1 act, created at the Théâtre des Variétés 23 January 1811
Les Habitants des Landes, vaudeville in 1 act created at the Théâtre des Variétés 21 October 1811
L'Homme sans façon ou les Contrariétés, opéra-comique in 3 acts, music by Rodolphe Kreutzer, created at the Opéra-Comique (Théâtre Feydeau) 7 January 1812
 corrigé ou la Journée aux accidents, one-act comedy, created at the Théâtre des Variétés 21 September 1812
Les Intrigues de la Rapée, vaudeville in 1 act cowritten with Dumersan et Merle, created at the Théâtre des Variétés in 1813
Les Deux Magots de la Chine, vaudeville in 1 act, created at the Théâtre des Variétés 12 January 1813
La Vivandière, vaudeville in 1 act, created at the Théâtre des Variétés 23 April 1813
Les Anglaises pour rire, ou la Table et le Logement, comedy in 1 act cowritten with Dumersan, created at the Théâtre des Variétés 26 December 1814
Les Amours du port au blé, comédie grivoise in 1 act, cowritten with Dumersan, created at the Théâtre des Variétés 14 June 1820
Maître Blaise, vaudeville in 2 acts cowritten with Maurice Ourry, created at the Théâtre du Vaudeville 27 November 1820
La Femme du sous-préfet, vaudeville in 1 act cowritten with Moreau created at the Théâtre du Gymnase-Dramatique 18 January 1821
Le Comédien d’Étampes, vaudeville in 1 act cowritten with Moreau created at the Théâtre du Gymnase-Dramatique 23 January 1821
Pierre, Paul et Jean, vaudeville in 2 acts cowritten with Maurice Ourry, created at the Théâtre du Vaudeville 3 November 1821
La Leçon de danse et d'équitation, vaudeville in 1 act cowritten with Nicolas Gersin, created at the Théâtre des Variétés 13 December 1821
Kabri le sabotier, vaudeville in 1 act, created at the Théâtre de la Porte-Saint-Martin 23 January 1822
Le Garde-moulin, vaudeville cowritten with Moreau, created at the Théâtre du Gymnase-Dramatique 28 January 1822
Rataplan ou le Petit Tambour, vaudeville in 1 act cowritten with Augustin Vizentini, created at the Théâtre du Vaudeville 25 February 1822
Amélie ou le Chapitre des contrariétés, comédie-vaudeville in 2 acts, created at the Théâtre du Vaudeville 2 July 1822
Les Mauvaises Têtes, vaudeville in 1 act cowritten with Maurice Ourry, created at the Théâtre du Vaudeville 6 January 1823
Nicolas Rémi, vaudeville in 2 acts, created at the Théâtre du Vaudeville 24 May 1823
Les Femmes de chambre, vaudeville in 1 act, created at the Théâtre du Vaudeville 21 June 1823
L'Atelier de peinture, tableau-vaudeville in 1 act cowritten with Léonard Tousez, created at the Théâtre du Gymnase-Dramatique 31 October 1823
Catherine, vaudeville in 1 act cowritten with Dumersan, created at the Théâtre des Variétés 28 October 1824
La Chambre de Suzon, one-act comedy mingled with couplets, cowritten with Carmouche and Dumersan, created at the Théâtre des Variétés 15 December 1825 
Les Amours du port au blé (2nd version), comédie-vaudeville in 1 act, cowritten with Dumersan, created at the Théâtre du Palais-Royal 28 October 1831
undated: Le Lithographe, vaudeville in 1 act cowritten with Léonard Tousez
undated: Le Chevalier d'honneur, vaudeville in 1 act cowritten with Léonard Tousez and Nicolas Gersin
undated: Riquet à la houppe, vaudeville-féerie in 1 act and 3 tableaux cowritten with Nicolas Brazier

Literature 
La Famille des menteurs, « ouvrage véridique », Masson, Paris, 1802 (Read online)
Histoire d'un chien, écrite par lui-même et publiée par un homme de ses amis, « ouvrage critique, moral et philosophique », Masson, Paris, 1802 (Read online)
Histoire d'une chatte, écrite par elle-même et publiée par un homme de ses amis, Masson, Paris, 1802.
Brick-Bolding
La Première Nuit de mes noces

Source : Gallica

References

Bibliography 
Jacques Isnardon, Le Théâtre de la Monnaie depuis sa fondation jusqu'à nos jours, Schott frères, Bruxelles, 1890   (Read online)

External links 
 His plays and their presentation on the site CÉSAR
 Sewrin (Charles-Augustin de Bassompierre) on lectura.fr.

18th-century French dramatists and playwrights
19th-century French dramatists and playwrights
French opera librettists
French chansonniers
Chevaliers of the Légion d'honneur
Writers from Metz
1771 births
1853 deaths
Burials at Montparnasse Cemetery